Frank Dietrich is the name of:

 Frank Sigel Dietrich (1863–1930), United States federal judge
 Frank Dietrich (footballer) (born 1959), German footballer
 Frank Dietrich (politician) (1966–2011), German politician
 Frank Dietrich (rower) (born 1965), German rower